Human chain may refer to:
Bucket brigade (for transporting items by passing them from hand to hand)
Human chain (politics) (a form of social expression)
Human Chain (poetry collection), a poetry collection by Seamus Heaney
Human Chain (band), a British jazz ensemble